High Pines is an unincorporated community in Miami-Dade County, Florida, United States.

Geography
High Pines is bounded on the north by the city of Coral Gables at Southwest 72nd Street, on the west by the city of South Miami at Southwest 57th Avenue, on the east by the unincorporated community of Ponce-Davis at School House Road, and on the south by Ponce-Davis at Southwest 80th Street.

High Pines is predominantly residential; however, there is a small commercial district along Southwest 57th Avenue.

History
In 2018, the neighboring city of Coral Gables made a proposal to annex High Pines and Ponce-Davis. In 2019 Miami-Dade County rejected this proposal along with a similar proposal to annex the unincorporated community of Little Gables.

References

Unincorporated communities in Florida